Governor Pingree may refer to:

Hazen S. Pingree (1840–1901), 24th Governor of Michigan
Samuel E. Pingree (1832–1922), 40th Governor of Vermont